Police Major Eugen Seim (4 July 1896 in Stuttgart – 7 March 1943 in Kiev) was a Nazi German officer during World War II, in charge of the Polizei-Battalion No. 83 of the German Schutzpolizei (or Schupo) involved in mass expulsions of some 18,000–20,000 ethnic Poles from the territory of Żywiec County in Silesia at the beginning of Nazi–Soviet occupation of Poland.  Seim was born in Stuttgart and died on the Eastern Front in the Soviet Union at the age of 47. He is buried at the military cemetery in Kiev.

Footnotes

References

German military personnel killed in World War II
Police of Nazi Germany
1896 births
1943 deaths
German police officers